The Rainer Maria Rilke Foundation (in French: Fondation Rainer Maria Rilke) was established in 1986 in Sierre, Switzerland, on the patronage of the municipality. Its goal is to promote the knowledge of Rainer Maria Rilke's works, through a museum, exhibitions, lectures, conferences, publications and a festival. The famous poet spent the five last years of his life in the city, living in the Château de Muzot, a 13th-century fortified manor on the edge of town.

Since 1987, the foundation installed the museum in the Maison de Courten, built in 1769, located at the rue du Bourg 30 in Sierre.

Festival Rilke
Since 2000,  the foundation organises every three years a Festival Rilke which takes place in the Château Mercier and its gardens. The program is made up of theater performances, readings, conferences, concerts, and dialogues between writers and readers. A writing workshop for children is also featured. The last festival theme, in August 2006, was "The Russian friendship : Rilke-Tsvetaïeva-Pasternak".

External links
Fondation Rainer Maria Rilke

Museums in Valais
Biographical museums in Switzerland
Sierre
Poetry museums
Museums established in 1986
1986 establishments in Switzerland
Rainer Maria Rilke